(The Abandonment of Ariane or, in German, Die Verlassene Ariadne), Op. 98, is an opera in one act by Darius Milhaud to a French libretto by Henri Hoppenot, based on Greek mythology.   It is the second of three Opéras-Minutes (Mini-Operas) that Milhaud composed. It came between  L'Enlèvement d'Europe, Op. 94, and La Délivrance de Thésée, Op. 99, with librettos also by Henri Hoppenot (1891–1977), a French diplomat. The three operas together last about twenty-seven minutes.

Performance history
The first performance of the trilogy - L'Enlèvement d'Europe, L'Abandon d'Ariane and  La Délivrance de Thésée  - was at the Hessisches Staatstheater Wiesbaden, Germany, on 20 April 1928. These performances were given in a German translation by Rudolph Stephan Hoffmann.

L'Abandon d'Ariane has been recorded several times; however, it is rarely performed live.

Roles

References

External links
Milhaud, his diplomat librettists, and the influence of Brazil, in The Boeuf chronicles, Pt. 30, by Daniella Thompson.

1928 operas
French-language operas
Operas by Darius Milhaud
One-act operas
Operas
Operas based on classical mythology
Phaedra
Cultural depictions of Theseus
Ariadne
Dionysus in art